Roger Bruce (born May 9, 1953) is an American politician. He is a member of the Georgia House of Representatives from the 61st District, serving since 2002. He is a member of the Democratic party.

References

Living people
Democratic Party members of the Georgia House of Representatives
1953 births
People from Harlem
21st-century American politicians